Mark 7 is the seventh chapter of the Gospel of Mark in the New Testament of the Christian Bible. It explores Jesus' relationships with both fellow Jews and Gentiles. Initially Jesus speaks with the Pharisees and scribes, and then with his disciples, about defilement. Later in the chapter Jesus heals two gentiles, one in the region of Tyre and Sidon and the other in the Decapolis region.

Text
The original text was written in Koine Greek. This chapter is divided into 37 verses.

Textual witnesses
Some early manuscripts containing the text of this chapter are:
Codex Vaticanus (325-350; complete)
Codex Sinaiticus (330-360; complete)
Codex Bezae (~400; complete)
Codex Alexandrinus (400-440; complete)

Clean and unclean 

Some Pharisees and some of the teachers of the Jewish law (scribes) come from Jerusalem to see Jesus, presumably in Galilee. Protestant Tübingen theologian Karl Heinrich Weizsäcker suggested that they had been sent to Jesus as a formal deputation.

They see some of his disciples eating without washing their hands. Mark then explains to his audience the Jewish custom of washing before dinner, indicating that he probably wrote for a non-Jewish audience. The Expositor's Greek Testament speaks of Mark writing "from the Gentile point of view"; the Cambridge Bible for Schools and Colleges suggests the explanation was "for Roman readers". The items listed by Mark which were customarily washed included cups, pots, and bronze kettles. Some manuscripts and accordingly some English translations add "couches" (klinōn), "couches for meals on which diseased persons (lepers, etc.) may have lain".

The Pharisees and scribes ask Jesus why they are not obeying the "tradition of the elders" (verse 5), and Jesus replies with a quote from Isaiah 29:13 and tells them "You have let go of the commands of God and are holding on to the traditions of men". He rebukes them for letting a man who makes an offering to God, i.e. money to the priests, no longer help his parents, in violation of the fifth commandment. That this was done is not found in other sources of the period, although "...rabbinic Jewish texts suggest that vows may be broken in such circumstances." (Miller 29)

He calls people to listen to him and explains that "Nothing outside a man can make him 'unclean' by going into him. Rather, it is what comes out of a man that makes him 'unclean'." (15) Later his disciples tell him they did not understand him, and he scolds them for being "dull". He explains to them that food cannot make a person unclean but "What comes out of a man is what makes him 'unclean.' For from within, out of men's hearts, come evil thoughts, sexual immorality, theft, murder, adultery, greed, malice, deceit, lewdness, envy, slander, arrogance and folly. All these evils come from inside and make a man 'unclean.'" (20-23) meaning intention of the "heart" is more important than ritual.

According to John J. Kilgallen, "...ultimately what is at stake here is knowledge of the divine will: Who knows best what God wants human beings to do." (135) This view is contrasted to the controversy, such as at the Council of Jerusalem, within the Early Church over just how much Mosaic law one must obey. Mark uses this story as evidence for his view in the Pauline direction, making scholars question how much of it is actually Jesus' own teaching and how much of it is Mark trying to win Gentile converts. If the author really is Saint Mark then this would indicate that his group, Peter's circle, had come around in the Pauline direction.

The saying, without the explanation, is also found in the Gospel of Thomas saying 14.

The Syrophoenician woman and the deaf mute man

Jesus then travels to the cities of Tyre and Sidon in what is now Lebanon. Mark tells the story of the Syrophoenician woman who finds Jesus at a friend's house in Tyre and begs him to heal her demon possessed daughter. He brushes her off, saying:
First let the children eat all they want, for it is not right to take the children's bread and toss it to their dogs 
The New King James Version refers to "little dogs" (kynarioi) and the Amplified Bible refers to "pet dogs". According to the Cambridge Bible for Schools and Colleges, "the heathen are compared not to the great wild dogs infesting Eastern towns (1 Kings 14:11; 1 Kings 16:4; 2 Kings 9:10), but to the small dogs attached to households".

The children are the children of Israel (Matthew's text refers to the "lost sheep of the house of Israel" ) and the little dogs are the Gentiles, a metaphor also found in other Jewish writing.

"'Yes, Lord,' she replied, 'but even the dogs under the table eat the children's crumbs.'" (28) Impressed with her answer, he tells her to go home and she returns home to find her daughter healed. This is one of the few times, and the only time in Mark's gospel, that Jesus performs a miracle at a distance, that is he does not touch nor is he near the girl. He only says it will be done and it is done, by his will alone. This passage shows that, according to Mark, Jesus' primary mission was to the Jews first and only then the Gentiles but Gentiles, as long as they have belief, can be part of that mission as well.

Jesus then goes to the Decapolis region and the Sea of Galilee. The Pulpit Commentary suggests his journey took him from Tyre "first northwards through Phoenicia, with Galilee on his right, as far as Sidon; and thence probably over the spurs of Libanus (Mount Lebanon) to Damascus, mentioned by Pliny as one of the cities of the Decapolis. This would bring him probably through Caesarea Philippi to the eastern coast of the Sea of Galilee". Here he comes across a man who is deaf and mute. He touches his ears and touches his tongue with his own spittle and says "Ephphatha! (which means, 'Be opened!')", Mark translating from the Aramaic. The man regains his hearing and speech and word quickly spreads. In this miracle, as opposed to the woman's healing, Jesus uses specific techniques, (the touching, the spit, the word), to effect a cure. This passage could be considered a fulfillment of Isaiah 35:5-6.

The argument with the Pharisees about food laws and the Syrophoenician woman are also found in Matthew 15:1-28

He charged them (diestelleto) not to tell anyone. "The word is a strong one: 'he gave them clear and positive orders' not to tell anyone".

See also 
Miracles of Jesus

References

Sources
Kilgallen, John J. (1989), A Brief Commentary on the Gospel of Mark, Paulist Press

Further reading

Brown, Raymond E. (1997), An Introduction to the New Testament, Doubleday 
Miller, Robert J. (1994), The Complete Gospels, Polebridge Press

External links
 King James Bible - Wikisource
English Translation with Parallel Latin Vulgate
Online Bible at GospelHall.org (ESV, KJV, Darby, American Standard Version, Bible in Basic English)
Multiple bible versions at Bible Gateway (NKJV, NIV, NRSV etc.)

Gospel of Mark chapters